Rebinea erebina is a species of moth of the family Tortricidae. It is found in Chile (Valparaiso, Bio-Bio and Araucania Regions) and Argentina. It is found in habitats ranging from coastal lowlands at about 50 meters altitude to elevations of 1400 meters.

The length of the forewings is 6.6-8.8 mm for males and 6.5-8.2 for females. The ground colour of the forewings ranges from pale grey to burnt umber with small patches of orange-brown The hindwings are white to pale brown with brownish grey mottling.

References

Moths described in 1883
Euliini